Katmandu is a furry comic book set in a fantasy world populated by anthropomorphic feline and rodent species. It was created by Carole Curtis, originally drawn by Terrie Smith and is one of two key titles published by Shanda Fantasy Arts—along with the publisher's namesake Shanda the Panda.

The original story introduced the framing story characters, Leahtrah and Thorin. They were members of warring cat nations; loosely modeled as the equivalent of the Arab–Israeli conflict in the Middle East after World War II. That first story arc involves their adventures in the desert which led to them falling in love and marrying.

However, the primary focus of the series is the stories Leahtrah tells about her ancestor, Liska. Liska was a noted warrior chief who was first captured in a raid and kept as a slave. However, when raiders attacked the village, Liska assisted in its defence and personally killed half the raiders. In recognition of her loyalty and her prowess in battle, Liska was immediately manumitted and given status as a free warrior of the tribe. She is based loosely on Woman Chief the Absaroka Amazon, of the Crow Native American nation.  Reviews have praised the book for its presentation of a detailed fictional setting and its characterization.

References

1996 comics debuts